North Randall is the name of several towns in the United States:

North Randall Township, Kansas in Thomas County, Kansas
North Randall, Ohio